Verrières-en-Forez (literally Verrières in Forez) is a commune in the Loire department in central France.

Population

See also
Communes of the Loire department

References

External links
Official website
Verrières-en-Forez on Maplandia

Communes of Loire (department)